Anthurium corrugatum is a species of plant in the genus Anthurium native to Central and South America from Panama to Ecuador. This species is noted for its cordate leaves with a network of fine veins that gives it a bullate appearance. A terrestrial grower, it is adapted to cool, humid climates. It is a member of the section Polyneurium along with Anthurium argyrostachyum and others.

References

corrugatum
Flora of Panama
Flora of Colombia
Flora of Ecuador
Plants described in 1902